The Delmarva Shorebirds are a Minor League Baseball team based in Salisbury, Maryland. They are members of the Carolina League and the Single-A affiliate of the Baltimore Orioles. Their home games are played at Arthur W. Perdue Stadium. The Shorebirds were members of the Class A South Atlantic League (SAL) from 1996 to 2020 and the Low-A East in 2021, though this was renamed the Carolina League and reclassified as Single-A in 2022. They won two SAL championships, in 1997 and 2000. Also in 1997, the Shorebirds received Baseball America's Bob Freitas Award for Class A baseball.

History
Frank Perdue's desire for a professional baseball team based in Maryland's Eastern Shore was the driving force in bringing a franchise to Salisbury. Joining the Maryland Baseball Limited Partnership, owners of the Bowie Baysox and Frederick Keys, set the concept in motion. By Autumn 1995 Maryland Baseball purchased the Albany Polecats from Richard M. Holtzman, relocated the franchise to Salisbury and renamed it the Delmarva Shorebirds. The name "Shorebirds" refers to the marine waterfowl of the Delmarva Peninsula. The team name was chosen by 7-year-old Katie Duffy of Newark, Delaware. The team's geographic appellation is a portmanteau of the states that govern counties on the peninsula: Delaware, Maryland, and Virginia (abbreviated VA).

The Shorebirds' first-ever game at Arthur W. Perdue Stadium was a 4–2 win over the Columbus RedStixx before a crowd of 5,787 on April 17, 1996. After fulfilling its two-year Player Development Contract with the Montreal Expos, it officially became an affiliate of the Baltimore Orioles on September 26, 1996.

The Shorebirds hosted the 2011 South Atlantic League "Strike Out Hunger" All-Star Game on June 21, 2011. The Shorebirds partnered with Perdue Farms, the Community Foundation of the Eastern Shore and Delmarva's three food banks: Eastern Shore Branch of the Maryland Food Bank, the Food Bank of Delaware, and the Eastern Shore Branch of the Food Bank of Southeastern Virginia; to help "Strike Out Hunger". Perdue and the Community Foundation of the Eastern Shore donated $20 to the food banks for each strike out by a Shorebirds pitcher during the Shorebirds 2011 season.

The Kyle Moore-managed Shorebirds in 2019 clinched their first postseason berth since 2005 by winning the SAL Northern Division first-half title with the minors' best midseason record at 48–21. A franchise-best 90–48 finish made them the 14th SAL team since 1980 to reach 90 wins in a regular season and the first since the Augusta GreenJackets in 2006. The season ended when the Shorebirds were swept by the Hickory Crawdads in the best-of-three SAL Northern Division Championship Series.

In conjunction with Major League Baseball's restructuring of Minor League Baseball in 2021, the Shorebirds were organized into the Low-A East. In 2022, the Low-A East became known as the Carolina League, the name historically used by the regional circuit prior to the 2021 reorganization.

Radio
The Shorebirds can be found on Fox Sports 960 AM, the Shorebirds' Flagship Station since 2005. Will DeBoer has been the radio voice of the Shorebirds since 2017 but is being replaced for the 2021 season by Sam Jellinek. Former announcers include Randy Scott, Bret Lasky and Brendan Gulick.

Roster

Notable alumni

 Michael Barrett (1996)
 Erik Bedard (2005)
 Mike Bordick (2001) MLB All-Star
 Zach Britton (2008) 2 x MLB All-Star
 Orlando Cabrera (1996)
 Manny Machado (2011)
 Endy Chavez (2012)
 Delino DeShields (1999)
 Mike Guerra (1938)
 Pat Hentgen (2002) 3 x MLB All-Star; 1996 AL Cy Young Award
 Ty Kelly (2010–11)
 Nick Markakis (2004) MLB All-Star
 Stu Miller (1949) 2 x MLB All-Star; 1958 NL ERA Leader
 Brian Roberts (1999, 2012) 2 x MLB All-Star
 Jayson Werth (1998) MLB All-Star
 Scott Williamson (2007) MLB All-Star; 1999 NL rookie of the Year

References

External links
 

Professional baseball teams in Maryland
Salisbury, Maryland
Baltimore Orioles minor league affiliates
Comcast subsidiaries
Baseball teams established in 1996
1996 establishments in Maryland
Carolina League teams
Defunct South Atlantic League teams